This article is a detailed listing of releases by singer-songwriter Stephin Merritt, including the discographies of The Magnetic Fields, The Gothic Archies, The 6ths, Future Bible Heroes, and solo releases by Merritt.

The Magnetic Fields

Albums

Singles

Non-album releases
"Plant White Roses" (Stephin Merritt re-recording), 5 Rows of Teeth (1994)
"Heroes", Crash Course for the Ravers: A Tribute to the Songs of David Bowie (1996)
"I Die: You Die", Random: Gary Numan Tribute (1997)
"Le Tourbillon", Pop Romantique: French Pop Classics (1999)
"Take Ecstasy with Me" (original Susan Anway recording), Oh Merge (1999)
"If I Were a Rich Man", Knitting on the Roof (1999)

The Gothic Archies

Albums

The 6ths

Albums

Singles

Future Bible Heroes

Albums

Solo
The following releases are credited solo to Stephin Merritt.

Albums
Eban and Charley (Merge, 2002)
Pieces of April (Nonesuch, 2003)
Showtunes (Nonesuch, 2006)
"Coraline (Original Cast Recording of the Off-Broadway play)" (2010)
Obscurities (2011)

Non-album releases
"The Meaning of Lice", Plague Songs (2006)
"I'm In A Lonely Way", iTunes-only single (2007)
"The Man of a Million Faces", NPR Music: Two Days with Project Song (2007)
"Beauty", Stroke: Songs for Chris Knox (2009)
"Not One Of Us", I'll Scratch Yours (2010)
"Dream Again", Covers E.P. (2011)

References

External links
 

Rock music discographies
Discographies of American artists